Luce is an American, English, Irish, Scottish, Welsh, French and Italian surname. It is also a French and Italian feminine given name, variant of Lucia and Lucy, or masculine name, variant of Luc (given name). Meaning of given name Luce is "light".

The English Luce surname is taken from the Norman language that was Latin-based and derives from place names in Normandy based on Latin male personal name Lucius. It was transmitted to England after the Norman Conquest in the 11th century. Alternative spellings and related names are: Luci, Lucy, Lucey, Lucie, Lucia, Luke.

Luce can refer to:

People

Given name
As a given name, Luci can refer to:
 Luce (singer) (born 1990), real name Lucie Brunet, French singer, winner of Nouvelle Star in 2010  
 Luce Caponegro (born 1966), Italian actress and TV presenter and a former pornographic actress, best known under the stage name Selen
 Luce de Gast, Lord of the castle of Gast
 Luce Dufault (born 1966), a French-Canadian singer
 Luce Fabbri (1908–2000), Italian anarchist writer
 Luce Irigaray (born 1930), Belgian feminist, philosopher, linguist, psychoanalytic, sociologist and cultural theorist

Surname
As a surname, Luce can refer to:
 A. A. Luce (1882–1977), Irish academic and cleric
 Albert Luce (1888–1962), American industrialist
 Charles D. Luce (1820–1887), American politician
 Clarence Sumner Luce (1852–1924), American architect
 Claire Luce (1903–1989), American actress and dancer
 Clare Boothe Luce (1903–1987), American playwright and politician
 Cyrus G. Luce (1824–1905), former governor of the U.S. state of Michigan
 Damien Luce (born 1978), French pianist
 David Luce (1906–1971), British Admiral and First Sea Lord of the Royal Navy
 Derrel Luce (born 1952), American football linebacker
 Don Luce (born 1948), Canadian hockey player
 R. Duncan Luce (1925–2012), American mathematician and psychologist
 Edward Luce (born 1968), British journalist
 Edwin John Luce (1881–1918), British writer and journalist in Jèrriais, the Norman language of Jersey
 Gordon H. Luce (1889–1979), an English scholar of Burma
 Henry Luce (1898–1967), co-founder and editor of Time Magazine, philanthropist
 John Luce (disambiguation)
 Lew Luce (born 1938), American football running back
 Maximilien Luce (1858–1941), French painter
 Mike Luce, American drummer
 Moses A. Luce (1842–1933), American Sergeant in the Union Army
 Renan Luce (born 1980), a French singer and songwriter
 Richard Luce (surgeon) (1867–1952) British medical doctor, army Major-General, MP for Derby
 Richard Luce, Baron Luce (born 1936), British politician
 Robert Luce (1862–1946), American politician
 Ron Luce (born 1961), American evangelist
 Stanford Luce (1923–2007), a translator of Jules Verne and Louis-Ferdinand Céline
 Stephen Luce (1827–1917), U.S. Navy admiral
 William Luce (colonial administrator) (1907–1977), British diplomat
 William Luce (1931–2019), American dramatist

See also
 Luci
 Lucia (disambiguation) or Lúcia
 Lucy
 Luz (name)